Simionato is a surname. Notable people with the surname include:

Carlo Simionato (born 1961), Italian sprinter
Chiara Simionato (born 1975), Italian long track speed skater
Giulietta Simionato (1910–2010), Italian mezzo-soprano
Omar Simionato (born 1971), Argentine footballer
Pedro Simionato (born 1938), Argentine cyclist